Bila Tserkva Raion is a raion (district) in Kyiv Oblast of Ukraine. Its administrative center is the city of Bila Tserkva. Population: .

On 18 July 2020, as part of the administrative reform of Ukraine, the number of raions of Kyiv Oblast was reduced to seven, and the area of Bila Tserkva Raion was significantly expanded. Six abolished raions, Rokytne, Skvyra, Stavyshche, Tarashcha, Tetiiv, and Volodarka Raions, as well as the city of Bila Tserkva, which was previously incorporated as a city of oblast significance and did not belong to the raion, and parts of Bohuslav and Vasylkiv Raions, were merged into Bila Tserkva Raion. The January 2020 estimate of the raion population was

Subdivisions

Current
After the reform in July 2020, the raion consisted of 13 hromadas:
 Bila Tserkva urban hromada, with the administration in the city of Bila Tserkva, transferred from the city of oblast significance of Bila Tserkva;  
 Fursy rural hromada with the administration in the selo of Fursy, retained from Bila Tserkva Raion;
 Hrebinky settlement hromada with the administration in the urban-type settlement of Hrebinky, transferred from Vasylkiv Raion.
 Kovalivka rural hromada with the administration in the selo of Kovalivka, transferred from Vasylkiv Raion.
 Mala Vilshanka rural hromada with the administration in the selo of Mala Vilshanka, retained from Bila Tserkva Raion;
 Medvyn rural hromada with the administration in the selo of Medvyn, transferred from Bohuslav Raion. 
 Rokytne settlement hromada with the administration in the urban-type settlement of Rokytne, transferred from Rokytne Raion. 
 Skvyra urban hromada with the administration in the city of Skvyra, transferred from Skvyra Raion.
 Stavyshche settlement hromada with the administration in the urban-type settlement of Stavyshche, transferred from Stavyshche Raion. 
 Tarashcha urban hromada with the administration in the city of Tarashcha, transferred from Tarashcha Raion.
 Tetiiv urban hromada with the administration in the city of Tetiiv, transferred from Tetiiv Raion.
 Uzyn urban hromada with the administration in the city of Uzyn, retained from Bila Tserkva Raion.
 Volodarka settlement hromada with the administration in the urban-type settlement of Volodarka, transferred from Volodarka Raion.

Before 2020

Before the 2020 reform, the raion consisted of three hromadas, 
 Fursy rural hromada with the administration in Fursy;
 Mala Vilshanka rural hromada with the administration in Mala Vilshanka;
 Uzyn urban hromada with the administration in the city of Uzyn.

Notable buildings

Various monuments of architecture located within the raion's territory include:
 Monument to Ivan Mazepa, 1991 in the village of Mazepyntsi.
 Church Zishestia Sviatoho Dukha, 1750 in the village of Shkarivka.
 Church Sviatoi Paraskevy, 1903 in the village of Oliinykova Sloboda.
 Church of the Wives of Myronosyts, 1893 in the village of Sorokotiahy.
 Cathedral of the Saint Ioanna Khrestytelia in Bila Tserkva.
 Mykhailivska Church, 1891 in Bila Tserkva.
 Preobrazhenska Church, 1849 in the village of Sukholisy.
 Oleksandriia Park, 1793-1797 in Bila Tserkva.
 Zymovyi (Winter) Palace in Bila Tserkva.

Notable residents
Famous people from the territory that is now known as the Bilotserkivskyi Raion include:
 Ivan Mazepa, from Bila Tserkva, was a Cossack Hetman of the Hetmanate in Left-bank Ukraine, in 1687–1708.
 Pavel Popovich, from Uzyn, is a Soviet cosmonaut of Ukrainian descent, arguably the first ethnic Ukrainian to fly in space.

See also
 Administrative divisions of Kyiv Oblast

References

External links

 kyiv-obl.gov.ua - Information about the Bila Tserkva Raion 
 Verkhovna Rada website - Administrative divisions of the Bila Tserkva Raion 
 heraldry.com.ua - Heraldry of the raion 

 
Raions of Kyiv Oblast
1930 establishments in Ukraine